The 2015–16 Cal State Bakersfield Roadrunners women's basketball team represented California State University, Bakersfield during the 2015–16 NCAA Division I women's basketball season. The Roadrunners, led by fifth year head coach Greg McCall, play their home games at the Icardo Center and were members of the Western Athletic Conference. They finished the season 12–19, 8–6 in WAC play to finish in a 3 tie for third place. They advanced to the semifinals of the WAC women's tournament where they lost to Texas–Rio Grande Valley.

Roster

Schedule

|-
!colspan=9 style="background:#005DAA; color:#FFD200;"| Non-conference regular season

|-
!colspan=9 style="background:#005DAA; color:#FFD200;"| WAC regular season

|-
!colspan=9 style="background:#005DAA; color:#FFD200;"| WAC Women's Tournament

See also
Cal State Bakersfield Roadrunners women's basketball
2013–14 Cal State Bakersfield Roadrunners women's basketball team
2015–16 Cal State Bakersfield Roadrunners men's basketball team

References

Cal State Bakersfield Roadrunners women's basketball seasons
Cal State Bakersfield